Elizabeth Monroe (née Kortright; June 30, 1768 – September 23, 1830) was the first lady of the United States from 1817 to 1825, as the wife of James Monroe, fifth president of the United States. Due to the fragile condition of Elizabeth's health, many of the duties of official White House hostess were assumed by her eldest daughter, Eliza Monroe Hay.

Birth, parents, and childhood
Born in New York City on June 30, 1768, Elizabeth was the youngest daughter of Lawrence Kortright, a wealthy merchant, and Hannah (née Aspinwall) Kortright. Elizabeth Monroe's paternal 2nd great grandfather, Cornelius Jansen Kortright, was born in Holland, Netherlands in the year of 1645, and immigrated to New York in the year of 1663. His father, Jan Bastiaenson Van Kortrijk, was also born in Holland, Netherlands in the year of 1618 and immigrated with his son to New York. Jan Bastiaenson's father, Bastiaen Van Kortrijk, was born in the city of Kortrijk in Flanders, Spanish Netherlands in the year of 1586, and immigrated to Holland, Netherlands in the year of 1615. Elizabeth's father was one of the founders of the New York Chamber of Commerce. During the Revolutionary War, he was part owner of several privateers fitted out at New York, and it has also been documented that he owned at least four slaves.  He purchased land tracts in what is now Delaware County, New York, and from the sale of this land the town of Kortright, New York, was formed.

Elizabeth acquired social graces and elegance at an early age. She grew up in a household with four older siblings: Sarah, Hester, John and Mary. According to the parish records of Trinity Church, New York, Elizabeth's mother, Hannah, died on September 6 or 7, 1777, at the age of 39.  The cause of death was recorded as resulting from Child Bed.  An unidentified sibling of Elizabeth, age 13 months, succumbed to flux and fever a few days later.  Mother and infant were both buried at St. George's Chapel in New York.  At the time of their deaths, Elizabeth was nine years old.  Her father never remarried.

On August 3, 1778, almost a year after the death of Elizabeth's mother, the home of the Lawrence Kortright family was nearly destroyed by fire during a blaze which caused damage and destruction to fifty homes near Cruger's Wharf in lower Manhattan. A historian later wrote that this blaze was due to the mismanagement of British troops while directing the firefighters. Elizabeth, age 10, with her father and siblings, survived the fire unscathed.

Courtship and marriage
Elizabeth first caught the attention of James Monroe in 1785 while he was in New York City serving as a member of the Continental Congress. William Grayson, James Monroe's cousin and fellow Congressman from Virginia, described Elizabeth and her sisters as having "made so brilliant and lovely an appearance" at a theater one evening, "as to depopulate all the other boxes of all the genteel male people therein." James, age twenty-seven, married Elizabeth, age seventeen, on February 16, 1786, at her father's home in New York City. The marriage was performed by Reverend Benjamin Moore, and recorded in the parish records of Trinity Church, New York. After a brief honeymoon on Long Island, the newlyweds returned to New York to live with her father until Congress adjourned. Their first child, whom they named Eliza Kortright Monroe, was born in December, 1786, in Virginia.

Ambassador's wife
In 1794, James was appointed United States Minister to France by President George Washington. In Paris, as wife of the American Minister during the Reign of Terror, she helped secure the release of Madame La Fayette, wife of the Marquis de Lafayette, when she learned of her imprisonment and threatened death by guillotine.  The Monroes also provided support and shelter to the American citizen Thomas Paine in Paris, after he was arrested for his opposition to the execution of Louis XVI.  While in France, the Monroes' daughter Eliza became a friend of Hortense de Beauharnais, step-daughter of Napoleon, and both girls received their education in the school of Madame Jeanne Campan. James was recalled from his Ambassadorship in 1796, due to his support of France in the opposition of the Jay Treaty.

Governor's wife
The Monroes returned to Virginia, where he became governor.  A son, James Monroe, Jr., was born in 1799 but died in 1801. During this time, Elizabeth suffered the first of a series of seizures and collapses (possibly epilepsy), which would plague her for the rest of her life, and gradually cause her to restrict social activities. The Monroe's third child, a daughter whom they named Maria Hester, was born in Virginia in early 1802.

Life in Great Britain
In 1803, President Jefferson appointed James to be United States Minister to Great Britain, and also the United States Minister to Spain. Elizabeth found the social climate there less favorable than in France, possibly because British society resented the United States' refusal to ally against France despite the governmental change. In 1804, James was sent as a special envoy to France to negotiate the purchase of Louisiana, in addition to remaining the Ambassador to both Great Britain and Spain.  That same year the Monroes were invited by Napoleon Bonaparte to attend his coronation in Paris, as part of the official American delegation.

Return to Virginia and Washington
The Monroes returned to Virginia in 1807. James Monroe won election and returned to the Virginia House of Delegates, and also resumed his legal career. In 1811 Monroe won election to another term as governor of Virginia, but served only four months. In April 1811, his friend President James Madison appointed Monroe Secretary of State, and the Senate agreed. However, Monroe had little to do with the War of 1812, as President Madison and the War Hawks in Congress were dominant. During the War, Elizabeth stayed primarily inland in Virginia, on the Monroe family estates, Oak Hill in Loudoun and later Ashlawn-Highland in Albemarle Counties.

The war went very badly, so Madison turned to Monroe for help, appointing him Secretary of War in September 1814 after the British had invaded the national capital and burned the White House. Monroe resigned as Secretary of State on October 1 but no successor was ever appointed, so he handled both offices from October 1, 1814, to February 28, 1815. As Secretary of War, Monroe formulated plans to invade Canada a second time to win the war, but the peace treaty was ratified in February 1815, before any armies moved north. Monroe, therefore, resigned as Secretary of War and was formally reappointed Secretary of State. Monroe stayed on at State until March 4, 1817, when he began his term as the new President of the United States.

First Lady of the United States
Elizabeth began her tenure as First Lady on March 4, 1817, when her husband commenced his first term as the fifth president of the United States. However, the White House was still under reconstruction, so Elizabeth hosted the inaugural ball at their private residence on I Street, and part of the time the First Family lived in the Octagon House. Since all the White House furnishings had been destroyed, the Monroes brought some from their private residences. Her husband was re-elected to a second term in office in 1820, and Elizabeth attended the inaugural ball held in Brown's Hotel. Therefore, she remained in her role of First Lady until March 4, 1825.

Although Elizabeth Monroe regained a measure of respect and admiration during her husband's second term, she compared poorly to her predecessor, Dolley Madison, who had captivated Washington society, setting a standard by which future First Ladies were measured. Furthermore, Elizabeth and her eldest daughter may have sought to make access to the White House more socially exclusive, reflecting French practices, which were barely tolerated given American democratic values, although President Monroe's term was also known for the good feelings and relations. Still, Elizabeth had made such an impression upon General Andrew Jackson that her husband always mentioned her to him in their correspondence. Elizabeth also drew favorable reviews as the couple briefly hosted General Lafayette during his return tour through America. During Elizabeth's illnesses, some of the social duties were carried out by her daughters, as discussed below. Furthermore, James or Elizabeth destroyed her correspondence, both between themselves and with others, before her death.

Since 1982 Siena College Research Institute has periodically conducted surveys asking historians to assess American first ladies according to a cumulative score on the independent criteria of their background, value to the country, intelligence, courage, accomplishments, integrity, leadership, being their own women, public image, and value to the president. Consistently, Monroe has been ranked in the lower-half of first ladies by historians in these surveys. In terms of cumulative assessment, Monroe has been ranked:
24th-best of 42 in 1982
23rd-best of 37 in 1993
31st-best of 38 in 2003
29th-best of 38 in 2008
30th-best of 38 in 2014

In the 2014 survey, Monroe and her husband were also ranked the 15th-highest out of 39 first couples in terms of being a "power couple".

Children
James and Elizabeth had three children:
 Elizabeth ("Eliza") Kortright Monroe Hay (1786–January 27, 1840): Born in Virginia in December, 1786, Eliza was educated at the school of Madame Jeanne Campan in Paris, when her father served as United States Ambassador to France. Eliza appeared to many a haughty, pompous socialite, quick to remind others of her good breeding and lofty station. In late September or early October 1808 she married George Hay, a prominent Virginia attorney who had served as prosecutor in the trial of Aaron Burr and later U.S. District Judge. Their daughter, Hortense, was named in honor of her childhood friend and classmate, Hortense de Beauharnais, step-daughter of Napoleon. During her father's presidency, Eliza alienated most of Washington society for her refusal to call on wives of the diplomatic corps, as was the custom, and caused another social furor in closing her sister's wedding to all but family and friends. For all her apparent vanity, however, she demonstrated genuine compassion during the fever epidemic that swept Washington during her father's Presidency. She spent many sleepless nights selflessly caring for victims. Following the deaths of her husband and father, Eliza moved to Paris, France, where she died on January 27, 1840. 
James Spence Monroe (1799–1800): The only son of the Monroes, James Spence was 16 months old when he died after "several days sickness".
Maria Hester Monroe Gouverneur (1802–June 20, 1850)  In an April 12, 1802 letter to James Madison, James Monroe states that his wife recently added a daughter to their family.  Parish records indicate that Maria was born on April 8. The following year, while still an infant, Maria accompanied her parents to London, when James Monroe became Ambassador from the United States to the Court of St. James.  Upon the family's return to the United States, Maria finished school in Philadelphia.  On March 9, 1820, she married her first cousin, Samuel L. Gouverneur, in the first wedding of a president's child at the White House. Many in Washington criticized the Monroes for keeping the wedding private; just 42 members of the family and close friends were invited. Friction between Maria's husband and her outspoken sister strained family relations thereafter. The Gouverneurs moved to New York City. Former President Monroe, upon losing his wife in 1830, moved in with them.  President John Quincy Adams appointed her husband postmaster of New York City.  Maria died on June 20, 1850, at the age of 48, at Oak Hill, in Loudon County, Virginia.

Death and legacy
After Monroe's terms as president expired, he and Elizabeth faced considerable debts from their years of public service, both from non-reimbursed entertaining expenses and because Monroe was forced to manage their various properties remotely. Monroe sold his plantation, Highland in Albemarle County to pay debts, and both retired to Oak Hill in Loudoun County, nearer Washington, D.C. and their daughter Eliza and her husband (although the Hays moved to Richmond in 1825 when he became the U.S. District Judge for Virginia). Although retiring, Elizabeth managed to travel to New York to visit her younger daughter, as well as other friends and relations, but made no further social visits. Sickly and suffering several long illnesses (including severe burns from a collapse near a fireplace a year after leaving the White House), Elizabeth died at Oak Hill on September 23, 1830, aged 62, her husband following her less than a year later, aged 73.

She was interred at the estate, but her husband later died in New York under their daughter's care and was originally buried in that northern state. His remains were moved 25 years after his death to become a key attraction during the development of Hollywood Cemetery in Richmond, Virginia. Elizabeth's remains were reinterred there in 1903, where both spouses remain buried.

The First Spouse Program under the Presidential $1 Coin Act authorizes the United States Mint to issue 1/2 ounce $10 gold coins and bronze medal duplicates to honor the first spouses of the United States.  Elizabeth Monroe's coin was released in February 2008.

A gown in the collection of the James Monroe Museum indicates Elizabeth was a petite woman, not taller than 5 feet.

Through her mother, she is a first cousin twice-removed to President Franklin D. Roosevelt. (Franklin D. Roosevelt's paternal grandmother, Rebecca Aspinwall Roosevelt, was a first cousin to Elizabeth Monroe.)

Relations

References

Bibliography

 McGrath, T. (2020). James Monroe: A Life. New York: Penguin Random House.

Notes

Citations

External links

 https://web.archive.org/web/20040301231620/http://www.whitehouse.gov/history/firstladies/em5.html
 
 https://archive.org/stream/courtrightkortri00abbo/courtrightkortri00abbo_djvu.txt 
Elizabeth Monroe at C-SPAN's First Ladies: Influence & Image

1768 births
1830 deaths
18th-century American people
19th-century American people
18th-century American women
19th-century American women
American people of Dutch descent
American people of English descent
Burials at Hollywood Cemetery (Richmond, Virginia)
Cornell family
First ladies of the United States
First Ladies and Gentlemen of Virginia
James Monroe
Elizabeth Kortright
People from Aldie, Virginia
People from New York City